All municipalities in the Canadian province of Ontario held municipal elections on December 6, 1976, to elect mayors or reeves, councillors, and school board trustees. Some areas also held local referendums.

David Crombie, a Red Tory, was re-elected as mayor of Toronto without serious opposition.

1976 elections in Canada
Municipal elections in Ontario
1976 in Ontario